JD Gaming (JDG), officially JDG Intel Esports Club, is a Chinese professional esports organization based in Beijing. It has two League of Legends teams: a main roster that competes in the League of Legends Pro League (LPL), the top-level league for the game in China, and an academy roster named Joy Dream that competes in the League of Legends Developmental League (LDL), China's secondary league. Both teams were formed on 20 May 2017 after e-commerce company JD.com acquired the LPL spot of the QG Reapers and the LSPL (now LDL) spot of Now or Never.

Prior to the acquisitions, JD Gaming had an all-female League of Legends team and an Overwatch team, both of which saw only minor success and were disbanded.

History 

Most of the QG Reapers' players and staff joined JD Gaming after their organization's acquisition by JD.com on 20 May 2017. JD Gaming's first roster consisted of top laner Kan "Kabe" Ho-man, junglers Kim "Clid" Tae-min and Chang "Xinyi" Ping, mid laner Kim "Doinb" Tae-sang, bot laners Xu "Barrett" Qiubin and Lee "LokeN" Dong-wook, and supports Hu "Cloud" Zhenwei and Zuo "LvMao" Minghao. The team's first tournament was the 2017 Demacia Cup, which they placed ninth to twelfth after losing 0–2 to LGD Gaming.

JD Gaming was placed in Group B for the 2017 LPL Summer Split, placing fifth in their group with a 6–10 record. The team qualified for the 2017 National Electronic Sports Tournament (NEST) after defeating Edward Gaming 2–0 in the qualifiers. JD Gaming was able to make it to the NEST finals, where they lost 0–2 to Invictus Gaming. Following NEST, JD Gaming underwent several roster changes: Kabe, Xinyi, Doinb, Barrett, and Cloud left the team, while top laner Zhang "Zoom" Xingran and mid laner Zeng "YaGao" Qo joined to replace the vacant positions. The newly revised roster of Zoom, Clid, YaGao, LokeN, and LvMao placed fourth in the 2017 Demacia Championship after losing 0–2 to Invictus Gaming once again.

During the 2018 LPL Spring Split, JD Gaming was a member of the league's eastern conference, where they placed fourth with a 10–9 record. This placement qualified them for playoffs, where they placed seventh to eighth overall after losing 0–3 to Bilibili Gaming. JD Gaming placed third in the 2018 LPL Summer Split eastern conference with a 13–6 record and qualified for playoffs, where they placed third again after defeating Rogue Warriors 3–0 in the third place match. The team was unable to qualify for the 2018 World Championship after Edward Gaming knocked them out of the 2018 LPL Regional Finals with a close 3–2 victory. JD Gaming took first place at NEST 2018 after defeating Topsports Gaming 2–1 in the finals.

Clid and LokeN left JD Gaming during the offseason on 20 November 2018. In December 2018, junglers Sung "Flawless" Yeon-jun and Đỗ "Levi" Duy Khánh were acquired from Rogue Warriors and 100 Thieves respectively, while bot laners Ju "Bvoy" Yeong-hoon and Gu "Imp" Seung-bin joined from Young Miracles and Team WE respectively to complete the roster. The new roster placed seventh to eighth in the 2018 Demacia Cup.

JD Gaming placed eighth in the regular season of the 2019 LPL Spring Split, barely qualifying for playoffs as the last seed. The team went on to exceed many analysts' expectations by making it to the grand finals after taking upset victories over Team WE, Royal Never Give Up, and FunPlus Phoenix, who were fifth, fourth, and first respectively in the regular season. However, JD Gaming was ultimately swept 3–0 by Invictus Gaming in the grand finals.

It was announced on 13 May 2019 that Levi and Bvoy had left JD Gaming, with the former returning to his former team, GAM Esports. On 23 May 2019, jungler Seo "Kanavi" Jin-hyeok joined JD Gaming from Griffin.

JD Gaming placed tenth in the regular season of the 2019 LPL Summer Split, missing playoffs. The team was unable to qualify for the 2019 World Championship after narrowly losing to Invictus Gaming in the first round of the regional finals. Imp retired and left JD Gaming at the end of 2019, and was replaced with former Top Esports bot laner Lee "LokeN" Dong-wook. With this new roster, JD Gaming took third place at the 2019 Demacia Cup, defeating Vici Gaming in the third-place match.

JD Gaming did not make any additional roster changes going into the 2020 LPL Spring Split, and finished second in the regular season. This placement gave JD Gaming a bye to the semifinals, where they swept defending world champions FunPlus Phoenix in an upset result. JD Gaming then defeated Top Esports in a close series at the grand finals, earning their first LPL title.

Current roster

Tournament results

References

External links 
 

2017 establishments in China
Esports teams established in 2017
Esports teams based in China
League of Legends Pro League teams